Paul Edward Patten (1920–1992) was an American ice hockey coach who helped revive the program at Cornell. The ex-Notre Dame quarterback returned to his hometown as a coach in 1947, taking over for both the football and ice hockey teams at St. Lawrence. While he stepped away from the hockey program after 1950 in favor of Olav Kollevoll he continued on with the football squad until 1955 when he left to accept the responsibility of leading the Cornell hockey team after its nearly decade-long abandonment.

The Big Red officially restarted in 1957 after the opening of the Lynah Rink, the school's first indoor facility, and as might be expected the team struggled through the first few years, going 16–54–2 in his first four years before Patten led them to a winning season in 1961–62, Cornell's first as a member of ECAC Hockey. Patten spent one more season behind the bench before resigning and turning over the program to Ned Harkness.

Head coaching record

Ice hockey

References

External links
 Paul Patten Career Record at College Hockey News
 

1920 births
1992 deaths
American football quarterbacks
Cornell Big Red men's ice hockey coaches
Notre Dame Fighting Irish football players
St. Lawrence Saints football coaches
St. Lawrence Saints men's ice hockey coaches
People from Canton, New York
Players of American football from New York (state)
Ice hockey coaches from New York (state)
American men's ice hockey players